The 2016 World Mixed Curling Championship was held from October 14 to 22 at the Sport Palace in Kazan, Russia. Among the 37 participating nations, Andorra, Croatia, South Korea and the Netherlands debuted on this event, while China, Israel and Lithuania didn't participate this time.

Teams

Group A

Group B

Group C

Group D

Group E

Round-robin standings
Final round-robin standings

Round-robin results
All draw times are listed in Moscow Time (UTC+3).

Group A

Saturday, October 15
Draw 3
12:00

Draw 4
16:00

Draw 4
16:00

Draw 5
20:00

Sunday, October 16
Draw 6
08:00

Draw 7
12:00

Draw 8
16:00

Draw 9
20:00

Monday, October 17
Draw 10
08:00

Draw 12
16:00

Draw 12
16:00

Draw 12
16:00

Tuesday, October 18
Draw 14
08:00

Draw 14
08:00

Draw 16
16:00

Wednesday, October 19
Draw 18
08:00

Draw 18
08:00

Draw 20
16:00

Thursday, October 20
Draw 22
08:00

Draw 22
08:00

Draw 22
08:00

Group B

Saturday, October 15
Draw 2
08:00

Draw 2
08:00

Draw 4
16:00

Draw 5
20:00

Sunday, October 16
Draw 6
08:00

Draw 7
12:00

Draw 8
16:00

Draw 8
16:00

Monday, October 17
Draw 10
08:00

Draw 10
08:00

Draw 12
16:00

Draw 13
20:00

Tuesday, October 18
Draw 15
12:00

Draw 16
16:00

Draw 17
20:00

Wednesday, October 19
Draw 19
12:00

Draw 19
12:00

Draw 19
12:00

Draw 21
20:00

Thursday, October 20
Draw 22
08:00

Draw 22
08:00

Group C

Friday, October 14
Draw 1
18:30

Saturday, October 15
Draw 2
08:00

Draw 3
12:00

Draw 4
16:00

Draw 4
16:00

Sunday, October 16
Draw 6
08:00

Draw 8
16:00

Draw 9
20:00

Draw 9
20:00

Monday, October 17
Draw 11
12:00

Draw 13
20:00

Draw 13
20:00

Tuesday, October 18
Draw 14
08:00

Draw 16
16:00

Draw 17
20:00

Wednesday, October 19
Draw 18
08:00

Draw 18
08:00

Draw 20
16:00

Draw 21
20:00

Thursday, October 20
Draw 23
12:00

Draw 23
12:00

Group D

Friday, October 14
Draw 1
18:30

Draw 1
18:30

Draw 1
18:30

Saturday, October 15
Draw 3
12:00

Draw 5
20:00

Draw 5
20:00

Draw 5
20:00

Sunday, October 16
Draw 7
12:00

Draw 8
16:00

Draw 9
20:00

Draw 9
20:00

Monday, October 17
Draw 11
12:00

Draw 11
12:00

Draw 12
16:00

Draw 13
20:00

Tuesday, October 18
Draw 15
12:00

Draw 15
12:00

Draw 16
16:00

Draw 17
20:00

Draw 17
20:00

Wednesday, October 19
Draw 19
12:00

Draw 19
12:00

Draw 21
20:00

Draw 21
20:00

Thursday, October 20
Draw 24
16:00

Draw 24
16:00

Draw 24
16:00

Draw 24
16:00

Group E

Friday, October 14
Draw 1
18:30

Saturday, October 15
Draw 2
08:00

Draw 2
08:00

Draw 3
12:00

Draw 3
12:00

Sunday, October 16
Draw 6
08:00

Draw 6
08:00

Draw 7
12:00

Draw 7
12:00

Monday, October 17
Draw 10
08:00

Draw 10
08:00

Draw 11
12:00

Draw 11
12:00

Draw 13
20:00

Tuesday, October 18
Draw 14
08:00

Draw 14
08:00

Draw 15
12:00

Draw 15
12:00

Draw 16
16:00

Draw 17
20:00

Wednesday, October 19
Draw 18
08:00

Draw 20
16:00

Draw 20
16:00

Draw 21
20:00

Thursday, October 20
Draw 23
12:00

Draw 23
12:00

Draw 23
12:00

Draw 24
16:00

Tiebreaker
Thursday, October 20, 20:00

Playoffs

1/8 Finals
Friday, October 21, 09:30

Friday, October 21, 13:30

Quarterfinals
Friday, October 21, 19:00

Semifinals
Saturday, October 22, 09:00

Bronze medal game
Saturday, October 22, 14:00

Gold medal game
Saturday, October 22, 14:00

References

External links

2016
2016 in curling
2016 in Russian sport
Sport in Kazan
21st century in Kazan
International curling competitions hosted by Russia
October 2016 sports events in Europe